Taler may refer to:

Thaler, a European silver coin
Täler, part of Hügelland/Täler, a  Verwaltungsgemeinschaft ("collective municipality") in the district Saale-Holzland, in Thuringia, Germany
Laura Taler, Romanian-born Canadian artist
Krzysztof Henryk Taler, president of Opoczno S.A., Poland
GNU Taler, a micropayment system, France
Taler (cryptocurrency), a Belarusian cryptocurrency